The 1899–1900 season was Newcastle United's second season in the Football League First Division, the top flight of English football at the time. Newcastle finished the season in 5th place.

Appearances and goals

Competitions

League

FA Cup

Friendlies

Matches

League

The match against Glossop on 1 January was abandoned and replayed on 14 March.

FA Cup

The match against Southampton on 10 February was abandoned after 55 minutes due to a heavy snowstorm.

Friendlies

External links
Newcastle United – Historical Football Kits
Season Details – 1899–1900 – toon1892
NUFC.com Archives – Match Stats – 1899–1900
Newcastle United 1899–1900 Home – statto.com

References

Newcastle United F.C. seasons
Newcastle United